"The Moment of Truth" is a song recorded by the rock band Survivor. It was the first hit single with their new lead singer Jimi Jamison, originally from Cobra, who replaced Dave Bickler. After making the No. 1 hit "Eye of the Tiger" for Rocky III, the band was asked to perform a composed song for the 1984 film The Karate Kid. The song reached No. 63 on the Billboard Hot 100 on July 7, 1984, and stayed on the chart for seven weeks. The song was later re-issued on the Vital Signs album in 2009 by Rock Candy.

Music video 
The music video shows the band performing in a culture Japanese park with mixed scenes from the movie. The song is written by Bill Conti, Dennis Lambert & Peter Beckett and published by Karussell Label.

Charts

Cover versions 
 Mari Hamada covered the song for her 1985 album Rainbow Dream.
 Carrie Underwood covered the song for her appearance in the fourth season of the Netflix series Cobra Kai.

References 

Survivor (band) songs
1984 singles
1984 songs
Songs written by Dennis Lambert
Songs written by Bill Conti
Songs written for films
Songs written by Peter Beckett
The Karate Kid (franchise) mass media